The American Roentgen Ray Society (ARRS) is the first and oldest radiology society in the United States. It was founded in 1900, in the early days of X-ray and radiation study.

Headquartered in Leesburg, Virginia, the society publishes a monthly peer-reviewed journal:  American Journal of Roentgenology (previously American Journal of Radiology), providing a forum for advances in radiology and related fields.  It provides scholarships, and presents awards.

The quarterly ARRS InPractice magazine keeps members informed of annual meeting plans and general Society information.

Its educational programs include seminars and a program of continuing education for radiologic technologists.

Its 9th meeting, in 1908, was held in New York City.  There, it announced that there was "no excuse whatever" for anyone being injured during medical X-rays, which "could be taken in a fraction of a second".

References

External links
 
 American Roentgen Ray Society records, 1913-1952 (inclusive), 1932-1941 (bulk). H MS c293. Harvard Medical Library, Francis A. Countway Library of Medicine, Boston, Mass.

Medical research institutes in the United States
Medical and health organizations based in Virginia
Organizations established in 1900
Radiology organizations